The following lists events that happened during 2013 in the Tunisian Republic.

Events

February 

 11 February: The Union for Tunisia is formed.

March 

 14 March: The Jebali Cabinet led by Prime Minister Hamadi Jebali dissolves and the Laarayedh Cabinet led by Ali Laarayedh is formed.

May 

 30 May: The Democratic Current political party is formed.

July 

 26 July: The National Salvation Front is formed.

September 

 23 September: The Free Destourian Party is formed.

Sports 

 Tunisia competes at the 2013 World Aquatics Championships in Barcelona, Spain. Oussama Mellouli wins two medals for Tunisia; one gold medal and one bronze medal.
 Tunisia competes at the 2013 World Championships in Athletics in Moscow, Russia.

References 

 
Years of the 21st century in Tunisia
Tunisia
Tunisia
2010s in Tunisia